The Provincial Fisheries Reference was a lawsuit decided in 1898 by the Judicial Committee of the Privy Council (JCPC). It arose from a government turf war in Canada over the jurisdictional boundaries of property rights in relation to rivers, lakes, harbours, fisheries, and other cognate subjects.  The 12-page judgment was delivered by Lord Hershell, and followed on from R v Robertson (1882). This case in the JCPC was an amalgamation of three separate Supreme Court of Canada appeals, which were grouped into one because of their similarities.  The judgment broke little ground, and can be considered a ringing affirmation of the Strong court.

References

1898 in case law
1898 in Canadian law
Fisheries law
History of fishing
Fishing in Canada
Water law
Legal history of Canada
1898 in Canada
Judicial Committee of the Privy Council cases on appeal from Canada
Canadian constitutional case law
Canadian federalism case law